Anoecida is an order of bicosoecids, a small group of unicellular flagellates, included among the heterokonts.

Classification 
 Family Caecitellidae Cavalier-Smith 2006
 Genus Halocafeteria Park, Cho & Simpson 2006
 Genus Caecitellus Patterson et al. 1993
 Family Cafeteriaceae Moestrup 1995 [Symbiomonadaceae Cavalier-Smith 2006; Anoecaceae Cavalier-Smith 2006]
 Genus Anoeca Cavalier-Smith, 2006
 Genus Symbiomonas Guillou & Chrétiennot-Dinet 1999
 Genus Cafeteria Fenchel & Patterson 1988

References

External links 
 

Bikosea
Heterokont orders